The 2017 Ivy League women's basketball tournament was a women's college conference tournament held March 11–12, 2017, at the Palestra on the campus of the University of Pennsylvania in Philadelphia. It was the first postseason tournament held by the Ivy League in women's basketball. Penn won the tournament, earning an automatic bid to the 2017 NCAA tournament.

Background
The Ivy League was the last NCAA Division I conference not to hold a postseason tournament, instead choosing to award its automatic bids to the NCAA men's and women's tournaments to its regular-season champions. In March 2016, the Ivies announced that they would institute men's and women's conference tournaments beginning with the 2016–17 season. Both tournaments will initially be held at the same site. The conference also reduced by one the number of regular-season games that its members are allowed to schedule.

Seeds
The top four teams in the Ivy League regular-season standings will participate in the tournament and will be seeded according to their records in conference play, resulting in a Shaughnessy playoff.

Schedule

Bracket

Broadcasters
TV/Internet Streaming– ESPN: Brenda VanLengen & Carol Ross– All games
Radio– Westwood One: Lance Medow & Kim Adams– Championship

See also
 2017 Ivy League men's basketball tournament

References

 

Ivy League women's basketball tournament
2016–17 Ivy League women's basketball season
Ivy League Women's B
Basketball competitions in Philadelphia
College basketball tournaments in Pennsylvania
2017 in Philadelphia
Women's sports in Pennsylvania